Suzanne Cowan is a Canadian Liberal party politician based in Toronto, Ontario. She is the current president of the Liberal Party of Canada.

Biography 
Suzanne Cowan is a native of Halifax. Cowan's father is Jim Cowan, a retired Liberal senator. Cowan received degrees from Mount Allison University and Université de Strasbourg in Strasbourg, France.

Cowan became the president of the Liberal Party of Canada in April 2018 after running unopposed. Prior to being president, she served as vice president from 2016 to 2018, and as a senior advisor to Justin Trudeau from 2012 to 2015.  In 2014, whilst Cowan was senior advisor to Trudeau, Trudeau had removed her father James and his fellow Liberal Senators from the Liberal caucus.

Personal life
Cowan lives in Toronto. She has two daughters, Grace and Clara Cunningham.

References

External links

Living people
Presidents of the Liberal Party of Canada
Year of birth missing (living people)